The 1997 Soul Train Music Awards was held at the Shrine Auditorium in Los Angeles, California on March 7, 1997. The show was hosted by Brandy, LL Cool J and Gladys Knight. It would be the final public appearance for the Notorious B.I.G., as he would be murdered two days after the ceremony.

Special awards

Quincy Jones Award for Outstanding Career Achievements
 Curtis Mayfield

Sammy Davis Jr. Award for Entertainer of the Year
 Babyface

Winners and nominees
Winners are in bold text.

R&B/Soul or Rap Album of the Year
 2Pac – All Eyez on Me
 Fugees – The Score
 R. Kelly – R. Kelly
 Outkast – ATLiens

Best R&B/Soul Album – Male
 Maxwell – Maxwell's Urban Hang Suite
 Babyface – The Day
 R. Kelly – R. Kelly
 Keith Sweat – Keith Sweat

Best R&B/Soul Album – Female
 Toni Braxton – Secrets
 Aaliyah – One in a Million
 Monifah – Moods...Moments
 Meshell Ndegeocello – Peace Beyond Passion

Best R&B/Soul Album – Group, Band, or Duo
 New Edition – Home Again
 112 – 112
 The Isley Brothers – Mission to Please
 Mint Condition – Definition of a Band

Best R&B/Soul Single – Male
 Maxwell – "Ascension (Don't Ever Wonder)"
 D'Angelo – "Lady"
 Joe – "All the Things (Your Man Won't Do)"
 Keith Sweat – "Twisted"

Best R&B/Soul Single – Female
 Toni Braxton – "You're Makin' Me High" / "Let It Flow"
 Mary J. Blige – "Not Gon' Cry"
 Brandy – "Sittin' Up in My Room"
 Monica – "Why I Love You So Much"

Best R&B/Soul Single – Group, Band, or Duo
 Blackstreet  – "No Diggity"
 112 – "Only You"
 Az Yet – "Last Night"
 Mint Condition – "What Kind of Man Would I Be?"

The Michael Jackson Award for Best R&B/Soul or Rap Music Video
 Bone Thugs-N-Harmony – "Tha Crossroads"
 2Pac  – "How Do U Want It" / "California Love"
 LL Cool J – "Doin' It"
 Busta Rhymes – "Woo Hah!! Got You All in Check"

Best R&B/Soul or Rap New Artist
 Maxwell
 112
 AZ Yet
 Tony Rich

Best Jazz Album
 Herbie Hancock – The New Standard
 Quincy Jones – Q's Jook Joint
 Diana Krall – All for You: A Dedication to the Nat King Cole Trio
 Art Porter – Lay Your Hands on Me

Best Gospel Album
 Kirk Franklin – Whatcha Lookin' 4
 Rev. Clay Evans – I've Got a Testimony
 Dottie Peoples – Count on God
 The Williams Sisters – Live on the East Coast

Performances
 En Vogue – "Don't Let Go (Love)"
 Blackstreet and Queen Pen – "No Diggity"
 Mint Condition – "What Kind of Man Would I Be?"
 Maxwell – "Sumthin' Sumthin'"
 The Isley Brothers – "Tears"
 Keith Sweat – "Twisted"
 Gladys Knight
 Fugees – "Killing Me Softly with His Song"
 Mary J. Blige & Nas – "Love Is All We Need"
 702 – "Get It Together"

References

Soul Train Music Awards, 1997
Soul Train Music Awards
Soul
Soul
1997 in Los Angeles